Charles Budd Schultz (born September 19, 1950), is a former Major League Baseball player who played pitcher from 1975–1979. He played for the Chicago Cubs and St. Louis Cardinals.

Schultz holds the NCAA record for most strikeouts in a game. On April 3, 1971, while playing for Miami University, he recorded 26 strikeouts against Wright State.

References

External links

1950 births
Major League Baseball pitchers
Baseball players from Ohio
Chicago Cubs players
St. Louis Cardinals players
Living people
Miami RedHawks baseball players